The 1979 James Madison Dukes football team was an American football team that represented James Madison University during the 1979 NCAA Division II football season as an independent. Led by eighth-year head coach Challace McMillin, the Dukes compiled a record of 4–6.

Schedule

References 

Madison
James Madison Dukes football seasons
Madison Dukes football